The 2001 Patriot League men's basketball tournament was played at Alumni Hall in Annapolis, Maryland and Hart Center in Worcester, Massachusetts after the conclusion of the 2000–01 regular season. Top seed  defeated #2 seed , 68–64 (OT) in the championship game, to win its second Patriot League Tournament title. The Crusaders earned an automatic bid to the 2001 NCAA tournament as #15 seed in the East region.

Format
All seven league members participated in the tournament, with teams seeded according to regular season conference record. Play began with the quarterfinal round, with the top seed receiving a bye to the semifinal round.

Bracket

* denotes overtime period

References

Tournament
Patriot League men's basketball tournament
Patriot League men's basketball tournament
Patriot League men's basketball tournament
Patriot League men's basketball tournament